Xenopus lenduensis, the Lendu Plateau clawed frog, is a species of frog in the family Pipidae endemic to the Orientale Province of the Democratic Republic of the Congo.

References 

lenduensis
Frogs of Africa
Amphibians described in 2011
Endemic fauna of the Democratic Republic of the Congo